Out of Silence may refer to:

 Out of Silence (Yanni album), 1987
 Out of Silence (Neil Finn album), 2017